Spirituál kvintet was a Czech folk band formed in 1960 by Jiří Tichota and others. The band's relevance in Czech culture can be compared to the popular folk band the Weavers in the US. They are widely considered one of the best and most important Czech folk bands.

Their album Šlapej dál (1985) sold more than 130,000 copies.

Members
Member Dušan Vančura died in April 2020.

Discography
 Písničky z roku raz dva (1973)
 Spirituály a balady (1978)
 Saužení lásky (1981)
 20 let (1984)
 Šlapej dál (1985)
 Every Time I Feel The Spirit (1986)
 Šibeničky (1988)
 Za svou pravdou stát (1990)
 Hallelu (1991)
 Rajská zahrada (1992)
 Antologie 1960-1995 (1994)
 Hanba nám! (1994)
 Na káře (1997)
 Vánoční koncert (1998)
 Křídla holubic (2002)
 Karel Zich a Spirituál kvintet (2004)
 Křížem krážem (2005)
 45 let archiv (2006)

References

 Helena Chaloupková: The History Of Czech Folk Music

External links

 Official page 
 
 

Czech folk music groups
Musical groups established in 1960
Musical groups disestablished in 2021
1960 establishments in Czechoslovakia
2021 disestablishments in the Czech Republic